Kaminski Brigade, also known as Waffen-Sturm-Brigade der SS RONA, was a collaborationist formation composed of Russian nationals from the territory of the Lokot Autonomy in Axis-occupied areas of the RSFSR, Soviet Union on the Eastern Front.
 
It was founded in late 1941 as auxiliary police with 200 personnel. By mid-1943 it had grown to 10,000-12,000 men, equipped with captured Soviet tanks and artillery. Bronislav Kaminski, the unit's leader, named it the Russian National Liberation Army.

After the Wehrmacht lost the Battle of Kursk in August 1943, RONA personnel retreated to the territory of Byelorussia, especially to the Lepel area of Vitebsk, where they participated in German security operations, committing numerous atrocities against the civilian population . The unit was absorbed into the Waffen-SS in June 1944. After Operation Bagration (June to August 1944), the RONA retreated further west, and by the end of July 1944, the remains of the Kaminski unit (3 to 4 thousand—some sources estimate 6 to 7 thousand) assembled at the SS training camp at Neuhammer (now Świętoszów). On the base of the Kaminski unit, SS leaders planned to form an SS Division – the 29th Waffen Grenadier Division of the SS RONA (1st Russian).

The Warsaw Uprising began on the same day that Heinrich Himmler signed an order for the establishment of the division (1 August 1944). The division formation was never implemented and part of the brigade was sent to Warsaw, where the unit again committed numerous atrocities. On 18 August 1944, Kaminski was killed in unknown circumstances. By August 27, 1944, having found the brigade too undisciplined and unreliable, the German commanders removed it from Warsaw. The unit was sent to Slovakia, and deployed against Slovak partisans. After the end of October 1944 the brigade was disbanded and the remaining personnel absorbed into General Andrey Vlasov's Russian Liberation Army.

History

In Russia

In October 1941, the Nazi Germany military advance into the Soviet Union reached Lokot area near the city of Bryansk and captured it on October 6, 1941. In November 1941, an engineer at the local alcohol plant, Bronislav Kaminski, and a local technical school teacher, Konstantin Voskoboinik, approached the German military administration with proposals to assist them in establishing a civil administration and local police. The Lokot area was, before the beginning of the war on the Eastern Front, designated for the incarceration of people forbidden to return to their previous homes in major cities of the Soviet Union – as Kaminski himself was. Voskoboinik was appointed by the Germans as starosta of the "Lokot volost" and head of the local militia unit.

The militia headed by Voskoboinik began with 200 men, and was to assist the Germans in conducting their different activities, which included murders of civilians loyal to or accused of loyalty to the Soviet authorities or Soviet partisans. By January 1942 militia numbers were increased to 400–500.

During a targeted raid under the command of Alexander Saburov on January 8, 1942, Voskoboinik was mortally wounded. After his death Kaminski took over command and expanded the militia.

In co-operation with German forces, the militia began anti-partisan operations and by the spring of 1942, its number increased to 1,400 armed personnel. The estimated number of Soviet partisans in this area was as high as 20,000 – they controlled almost the entire rear area of Army Group Center's area of operations.

In mid-March 1942, Kaminski's representative assured the German Second Panzer Army at Orel that Kaminski's unit was "ready to actively fight the guerillas" and to carry on a propaganda campaign against "Jew-Bolshevism" and Soviet partisans. Thereafter, commander of 2nd Army Generaloberst Rudolf Schmidt appointed Kaminski as mayor of the Army Rear Area 532 with its center in the town of Lokot. On 19 July 1942, after approval from Commander of Army Group Centre,Field Marshal Günther von Kluge, Schmidt and 532 Area commander Volksdeutsche, Kaminski received a certain degree of autonomy and nominal self-rule and self-governing powers under the supervision of Major von Veltheim and Colonel Rübsam.

Kaminski was made a chief major of the Autonomous Administration of Lokot (comprising eight raions) and brigade commander of the local militia.

Starting in June 1942, Kaminski's militia took part in the major action codenamed Operation Vogelsang as a part of Generalleutnant Werner Freiherr von und zu Gilsa's Kampfgruppe (taskforce) Gilsa II. This Kampfgruppe included one Panzer regiment from 5. Panzer-Division, elements of 216. Infanterie-Division, the Kaminski militia and elements of the Hungarian 102. Light Division and 108. Light Division. The militia, serving as guides, scouts and translators, stayed with Kampfgruppe Gilsa II until it was disbanded in October 1942. The official results of this operation, the first major one where Kaminski's troops participated, were 1,193 alleged partisans killed, 1,400 wounded, 498 captured, 12,531 civilians "evacuated". The Kampfgruppe suffered 58 killed and 130 wounded from a strength of over 6,500.

Russian National Liberation Army
Kaminski now decided to give his militia an official title. He decided on the Russian National Liberation Army (Russkaya Osvoboditelnaya Narodnaya Armiya, RONA). In autumn 1942 Kaminski ordered an obligatory draft into the militia of all able-bodied men. Units were also reinforced from the "volunteers" drafted among Soviet POWs at nearby Nazi concentration camps. From 1941 on, due to lack of fuel and minor mechanical failures, Kaminski's unit was ordered to collect abandoned Soviet tanks and armored cars, and by November 1942, his unit was in possession of at least two BT-7 tanks and one 76 mm artillery system.

Due to the lack of military dress and boots (some units were barefoot), the Germans provided used uniforms for Kaminski's brigade, sufficient for only 4 battalions.

By late 1942, the militia of the Lokot Autonomy had expanded to the size of a 14-battalion brigade, close to 8,000 armed men. From November 19, 1942 till December 1942, Lokot was inspected under the orders of Alfred Rosenberg.
As of January 1943, the brigade numbered 9828 men; the armoured unit of the brigade had one heavy KV-II, two medium T-34, 3 BT-7 and 2 BT-5 light tanks and 3 armored cars (BA-10, 2 BA-20).

In the spring of 1943, the brigade's structure was reorganized – there were 5 regiments created with 3 battalions each, an anti-aircraft battalion (3 AAA guns and 4 heavy machineguns), and an armoured unit. A separate "guard" battalion was created; brigade strength was estimated up to 12,000 in total.

Prior to Operation Citadel, the massive offensive to destroy the Kursk salient, in May–June 1943 the brigade took part in Operation Zigeunerbaron ("Gypsy Baron") together with other German units.

This operation was followed by similar operations – Freischütz and Tannhäuser. The brigade, together with other units under German command, was involved in action against partisans and also took part in reprisal operations against the civilian population.

In the summer of 1943, the brigade began to suffer major desertions due in part to the recent Soviet victories and to the efforts of the partisans to "turn" as many of Kaminski's troops as possible. As a part of these efforts, several attempts on Kaminski's life were made. Each time, Kaminski narrowly avoided death and punished the conspirators with execution. Several German officers passing through Lokot reported seeing bodies hanging from gallows outside Kaminski's headquarters. Fearing a breakdown in command, a German liaison staff was attached to Kaminski's HQ to restructure the brigade and return stability to the unit.

At this time the strength of the unit was estimated at up to 8,500 men. The armoured unit of the brigade had one heavy KV-II, four medium T-34, 3 BT-5 light tanks, one T-37 amphibious tank, one armoured car (BA-10) and two armoured carriers.

After the failure of Citadel, the Soviet counter-offensives forced the brigade, along with their families, to flee with the retreating Germans. On July 29, 1944, Kaminski issued orders for the evacuation of property and families of RONA brigade members and Lokot authorities. Up to 30,000 persons (10-11,000 of them brigade members) were transferred by the Germans to the Lepel area of Vitebsk in Belarus by the end of August 1943. According to post-war Soviet estimates up to 10,000 civilians were killed during the existence of the Kaminski formation.

In Belarus
The brigade finally settled in the Lepel area of Vitebsk. This area was overrun by partisans, and the brigade was involved in heavy combat in this area for the rest of the year.

During the retreat, desertions from the brigade increased greatly, and the entire formation seemed close to disintegration. When the commander of the Second Regiment, Major Tarasov, decided to join the partisans with all his regiment (he was offered amnesty if his entire regiment joined the partisans), Kaminski flew to Tarosov's headquarters and, according to one account, strangled him and 8 others in front of his men. Despite the threat of repercussions up to 200 men deserted within the following two days. By the beginning of October 1943 the brigade had lost 2/3 of its personnel, while still being in possession of 12 tanks (8 of them T-34's), one 122-mm, 3– 76 mm and 8 45 mm artillery systems.

On January 27, 1944, Himmler rewarded Kaminski's "achievements" by decorating him with the Iron Cross 2nd Class and on the same day the Iron Cross 1st Class.

On February 15, 1944, Kaminski issued an order to relocate the brigade and administration further west to the Dyatlovo area of West Belarus.

Volksheer-Brigade
At this point, the brigade's ranks were replenished by the addition of police forces from Belarus.  In March 1944, the brigade was renamed Volksheer-Brigade Kaminski. Starting on April 11, 1944, it was attached to SS-Kampfgruppe von Gottberg, which also included the notorious Dirlewanger unit, and participated in a series of anti-partisan operations: Regenschauer (up to 7,000 partisans reported as killed), Frühlingsfest (7,011 partisans reported as killed and 1,065 weapons captured) and Kormoran (7,697 partisans reported as killed and 325 weapons captured). During these operations local civilians were shot as "suspected partisans" or deported as slave laborers, their villages burned down.	
[[File:Bundesarchiv Bild 101I-280-1075-10A, Russland, Borislaw Kaminski.jpg|thumb|Bronislav Kaminski and personnel of the Volksheer-Brigade Kaminski" operation"Frühlingsfest", Belarus, May 1944]]

Waffen-Sturm-Brigade
In June 1944, the brigade was absorbed as part of the Waffen-SS. With its transfer to the Waffen-SS, the brigade was renamed Waffen-Sturm-Brigade RONA, and Kaminski was given the rank of Waffen-Brigadeführer der SS, as the only man with such rank.

As a result of the Operation Bagration, anti-partisan activities of the brigade were halted and its personnel (3,000-7,000, sources vary) collected at the SS training camp Neuhammer and plans were made for a non-German SS Division, and the structure was laid down for the 29.Waffen-Grenadier-Division der SS (russische Nr.1) based on the brigade by an order issued August 1, 1944. On the same day, Kaminski received a new rank of Waffen-Brigadeführer and General-Major of Waffen-SS.

In Warsaw
The Warsaw Uprising, which started on August 1, 1944, changed Himmler's plans and, on August 4, 1944, a combat ready regiment of the brigade was ordered to assist the efforts in crushing the uprising. SS-Gruppenführer Heinz Reinfarth was placed in charge of Kampfgruppe Reinfarth, a pacification unit which consisted of the Kaminski along with the Dirlewanger, several other Ordnungspolizei and SS rear area units. Himmler personally requested Kaminski's assistance, and the latter obliged by gathering a task force of 1,700 unmarried men and sending them (some sources state they had four T-34 tanks, one SU-76 and a few artillery pieces) to Warsaw as the mixed regiment under field command of Kaminski's brigade chief-of-staff, SS-Sturmbannführer Ivan Frolov. Frolov in 1945 stated that regiment had up to 1600 men and seven artillery pieces and four mortars.Kaminski volunteers were first given the task of clearing the Ochota district defended by only 300 poorly armed Poles.  Their attack was planned for the morning of August 5, but when the time came, Kaminski's men could not be found.  After some searching, they were found looting abandoned houses in the rear.  The attack finally got underway shortly before noon and it went poorly, with the brigade advancing only 275 meters before nightfall. The men had neither training for nor prior experience in urban combat.  For many it was the first time they had even seen a major city and they fought poorly while suffering high casualties.  At the same time, thousands of Polish civilians were killed by the RONA SS men during the events known as the Ochota massacre; many of the victims were also raped. In the middle of the month, the Kaminski was moved north to the Wola sector, but it fared no better in combat there than in Ochota.  In one incident, a sub-unit had stopped their advance to loot a captured building on the front line and was consequently cut off and destroyed by the Poles.

By August 27, the German commanders decided the brigade was too undisciplined and unreliable. In almost a month of fighting, the brigade had still not achieved any of its major objectives. The German commander in Warsaw,
SS-Obergruppenführer Erich von dem Bach-Zelewski, stated in post war trials that the unit "had no military combat value whatsoever, with both officers and soldiers having not even a hint of tactical understanding.  "I saw Kaminski's men removing entire cartloads of stolen jewellery, gold watches, and precious stones. The capture of a liquor supply was more important for the brigade than the seizure of a position commanding the same street. Each assault was instantly stopped, because after taking the objective over, units dispersed into loose, plundering hordes." Kaminski himself was involved in the looting in Warsaw, claiming he was collecting for his "Russian Liberation Fund". Major General Günter Rohr, commander of Warsaw's southern sector, demanded that the brigade be removed from his command. Bach-Zelewski agreed as the troublesome unit was slowing his efforts to suppress the uprising. As soon as replacement units were available, the Kaminski was pulled out of the line after losing about 500 men in combat during the fighting in Warsaw.

The RONA volunteers, now decimated and infamous even among the SS, were then assigned to the Kampinos Forest to help seal off Warsaw. During their stay in the forest, the unit's artillery battery and one of its infantry battalions were suddenly attacked by 80 Polish partisans led by Lieutenant Colonel "Dolina" (Adolf Pilch) while stationed at the emptied village of Truskaw. Nearly 100 Russian and German SS-men died in the midnight assault. The remnants of the battalion, which was mostly drunk at the time of the attack, fled in disarray, abandoning their weapons as they fled. In Truskaw, the 1st Regiment lost its entire artillery and much of the stolen merchandise from the city. A captured diary of the Kaminski'' brigade soldier, Ivan Vashenko, (killed at Truskaw) was published in Poland in 1947.

At the time of the Warsaw actions, Kaminski was called to Łódź to attend a leadership conference. He never reached it. Officially, Polish partisans were blamed for an alleged ambush in which Kaminski and a few RONA officials (including brigade chief-of-staff Waffen-Obersturmbannführer Ilya Shavykin) were killed. Some sources say he was placed in front of a military tribunal and then shot by a firing squad, others that he was shot when he was captured by the Gestapo.
 
The death of Kaminski and the unreliability of his troops as a combat unit brought the plans to expand the Kaminski Brigade to a division to an end. After Kaminski's death, his unit was placed under the command of the SS-Brigadeführer and Generalmajor der Polizei Christoph Diehm.

In Slovakia
As the front line approached again, the remnants of the brigade and accompanying civilian refugees were due to be evacuated to Hungary, but the start of the Slovak National Uprising left it stranded in railway trains near Racibórz in southern Poland.

From September 27, 1944 the brigade was under overall command of SS-Gruppenführer . In October, after inspection of the brigade personnel in the Raum Kattowitz, the Germans decided to absorb the remnants of Kaminski's brigade into General Andrey Vlasov's Russian Liberation Army.

Dissolution
From November 1944, remnants of the brigade (some sources estimated its strength at up to 2,000) forwarded into the military training camp Münsingen, with a formation of the 600. Infanterie-Division (russisch) as part of Andrey Vlasov's Russian Liberation Army. The former RONA were used to form one of the division's regiments. 
Accompanying civilians were sent to work in Pomerania.

After the war
After the end of World War II in Europe, some of the former RONA and Lokot personnel were repatriated by Western Allies to the Soviet Union. At the end of 1946 a Military Court of the USSR handed Ivan Frolov and several others a death sentence. In the 1950s and 1960s in the USSR, dozens of other former members were found, some of them also convicted and sentenced to death. The last member of Lokot/RONA personnel to be prosecuted was Antonina Makarova, who was responsible for at least 168 executions, but likely about 1500 executions. Makarova was arrested in 1978. She was convicted of treason, sentenced to death, and executed in 1979.

Ranks and insignia

The ranks from May 1943 to June, 1944 were:

In 1942 – white arm bands with a St. George's cross. From May 1943 – arm-badge 
white shield with red borders with black St. George's cross. In the upper part a yellow abbreviation "POHA". Some sources noted that the Nazi swastika also appeared on the brigade banner.

Commanders

See also
 List of German divisions in World War II
 List of Waffen-SS divisions
 Ranks and insignia of the Waffen-SS
 Waffen-SS foreign volunteers and conscripts

References

Footnotes

Bibliography
 Untermenschen in SS Uniforms: 30th Waffen-Grenadier Division of Waffen SS Leonid Rein The Journal of Slavic Military Studies, 1556–3006, Volume 20, Issue 2, 2007, Pages 329–345
 Bishop C. Zagraniczne formacje SS. Zagraniczni ochotnicy w Waffen-SS w latach 1940–1945. Warszawa, 2006
 GEORG TESSIN Verbände und Truppen  der deutschen Wehrmacht und Waffen-SS im Zweiten Weltkrieg 1939–1945 VIERTER BAND: Die Landstreitkräfte 15–30 VERLAG E. S. MITTLER & SOHN GMBH. – FRANKFURT/MAIN 1970 
 GEORG TESSIN Verbände und Truppen  der deutschen Wehrmacht und Waffen-SS im Zweiten Weltkrieg 1939–1945 SECHSTER BAND: Die Landstreitkräfte 71-13 0 BIBLI O VERLAG OSNABRÜCK 1972

Russian collaborators with Nazi Germany
Warsaw Uprising German forces
Waffen-SS brigades
Belarusian collaborators with Nazi Germany
Security units of Nazi Germany established in 1941
Security units of Nazi Germany disestablished in 1944